Karzakan is a village in Bahrain. It lies along the western coast of Bahrain Island.  The seventeenth-century theologian Salih Al-Karzakani hailed from this village.

References
 Bahrain: A Tale of Two Villages, Jeff Black, RTÉ World Report, May 3, 2008

Populated places in the Northern Governorate, Bahrain
Populated coastal places in Bahrain